Zhou Gucheng (September 13, 1898 – November 10, 1996) was a Chinese male politician, who served as the vice chairperson of the Standing Committee of the National People's Congress.

References 

1898 births
1996 deaths
Vice Chairpersons of the National People's Congress